Søren Tobias Årstad (2 June 1861 – 11 January 1928) was a Norwegian jurist and politician for the Liberal Party.

He was mayor of Stavanger from 1891 to 1892, and a member of the Storting from 1897 to 1900. A member of the cabinet Steen, he served as Minister of Finance, and he was Minister of Justice and the Police in Otto Blehr's first cabinet. A member of the Storting from 1912 tp 1915, he served as vice president and president of the Storting.

Personal life 
Årstad was born in Stavanger as a son of merchant Edvard Årstad and his wife Signe Amalie Torjusen. He was a first cousin of Wilhelm Aarstad. He married Barbro Cecilie Rasmussen in 1890.

Career 
Årstad finished his secondary education in 1879 and graduated with the cand.jur. degree in 1885. After some time as junior solicitor in Risør he settled as an attorney in Stavanger in 1885. He was elected to the city council, and served as Mayor of Stavanger from 1891 to 1892.

He was elected to the Parliament of Norway from Stavanger og Haugesund in 1897, serving until 1900. He then served as Minister of Finance from 1900 to 1901, member of the Council of State Division in Stockholm until 1902, then Minister of Justice and the Police until October 1903.

In 1903 he was appointed as the district stipendiary magistrate in Ryfylke District Court. He was elected to Parliament for a second term in 1912, serving until 1915. During this period he also served as vice president and president of the Parliament. He was decorated Knight, First Class of the Order of St. Olav in 1901, and Commander, First Class in 1903. He died in January 1928.

The street Søren Årstads vei in the borough of Hillevåg, Stavanger, was named after him in 1954.

References

1861 births
1928 deaths
Liberal Party (Norway) politicians
Politicians from Stavanger
Mayors of places in Rogaland
Presidents of the Storting
Members of the Storting
Ministers of Finance of Norway
Ministers of Justice of Norway